Cronaca Sovversiva (Subversive Chronicle) was an Italian-language, United States-based anarchist newspaper associated with Luigi Galleani from 1903 to 1920. It is one of the country's most significant anarchist periodicals.

History 

Prior to founding Cronaca Sovversiva, Luigi Galleani became involved in anarcho-communist activism beginning in the 1880s and showed a predilection for speaking and writing convincingly on the topic. After escaping an Italian prison sentence, he traveled through to Paterson, New Jersey, in 1901. After being wounded during the 1902 Paterson silk strike and charged with incitement to riot, he first escaped to Canada before settling in Barre, Vermont, under an assumed name among Italian quarriers. There he began publishing the Italian-language anarchist newspaper Cronaca Sovversiva in 1903.

The newspaper was banned from Italy in October 1915, and from the United States Mail in June 1917. He continued to print the newspaper and distribute it cross-country via Railway Express and a network of supporters who delivered it locally.

References

Bibliography

Further reading

External links 

 Archives in the Library of Congress

1903 establishments in the United States
1918 disestablishments in the United States
Anarchist newspapers
Insurrectionary anarchism
Italian-language newspapers published in the United States
Publications established in 1903
Publications disestablished in 1918
Galleanisti